Orthophytum leprosum is a plant species in the genus Orthophytum. This species is endemic to Brazil.

References

leprosum
Flora of Brazil